Dessislava Eva Dupuy (born 10 June 1993), known as Dessi Dupuy, is a Bulgarian footballer who plays as a midfielder or a forward for Swedish club Växjö DFF and the Bulgaria women's national team.

Early life
Dupuy was born in Sofia to a Nigerian father and a Turkish mother. When she was two, having previously been left in an orphanage, she was adopted by an American woman, from whom she has taken her current last name, and then taken to live in the United States. She was raised in Lynchburg, Virginia.

High school and college career
Dupuy has attended the E. C. Glass High School the University of Lynchburg in her hometown.

Club career
Dupuy is a product of Central Virginia United SC in the United States. She has played for ETG Ambilly in France; for AGSM Verona, Hellas Verona and Florentia in Italy and for KIF Örebro DFF in Sweden.

International career
Dupuy capped for Bulgaria at senior level during the 2023 FIFA Women's World Cup qualification.

References

External links

1999 births
Living people
Footballers from Sofia
Bulgarian women's footballers
Women's association football midfielders
Women's association football forwards
A.S.D. AGSM Verona F.C. players
Florentia San Gimignano S.S.D. players
KIF Örebro DFF players
Serie A (women's football) players
Damallsvenskan players
Bulgaria women's international footballers
Bulgarian expatriate footballers
Bulgarian expatriate sportspeople in France
Expatriate women's footballers in France
Bulgarian expatriate sportspeople in Italy
Expatriate women's footballers in Italy
Bulgarian expatriate sportspeople in Sweden
Expatriate women's footballers in Sweden
Bulgarian people of Nigerian descent
Bulgarian people of Turkish descent
LGBT association football players
Bulgarian LGBT sportspeople
Adoptees
Bulgarian emigrants to the United States
Naturalized citizens of the United States
American adoptees
Sportspeople from Lynchburg, Virginia
Soccer players from Virginia
American women's soccer players
Lynchburg Hornets athletes
College women's soccer players in the United States
American expatriate women's soccer players
American expatriate sportspeople in France
American expatriate sportspeople in Italy
American expatriate sportspeople in Sweden
African-American women's soccer players
American sportspeople of Nigerian descent
American people of Turkish descent
LGBT people from Virginia
American LGBT sportspeople
LGBT African Americans
Hellas Verona Women players
African American adoptees